Takashi Kondo is a voice actor
 
Takashi Kondo (footballer)
Takashi Kondo (gymnast)